William John Ryott Maughan (8 January 1863 – 10 April 1933) was an English-born politician in Queensland, Australia. He was a Member of the Queensland Legislative Assembly and an Australian Senator.

Early life
William Ryott Maughan was born in London on 8 January 1863.

He was educated at Leeds Grammar School before migrating to Australia in 1884, where he became a public servant and journalist.

Politics
He served on the Toowong Shire Council.

In 1898 he was elected in a by-election to the Legislative Assembly of Queensland as the Labor member for Burnett. He was defeated in 1899.

He was returned to the Assembly as the member for Ipswich in the 1904 state election, defeating sitting member Thomas Bridson Cribb. He represented Ipswich until 1912.

In 1913 he was elected to the Australian Senate as a Labor Senator for Queensland, remaining in the Senate until his defeat in 1919, taking effect in 1920.

Later life
Maughan died on 10 April 1933 and was Cremated at Rookwood Cemetery.

References

 

Australian Labor Party members of the Parliament of Australia
Members of the Australian Senate for Queensland
Members of the Australian Senate
People educated at Leeds Grammar School
1863 births
1933 deaths
Australian Labor Party members of the Parliament of Queensland
20th-century Australian politicians
Members of the Queensland Legislative Assembly